The Burr conspiracy was a plot alleged to have been planned by Aaron Burr in the years during and after his term as Vice President of the United States under US President Thomas Jefferson. According to the accusations against Burr, he attempted to use his international connections and support from a cabal of US planters, politicians, and army officers to establish an independent country in the Southwestern United States and parts of Mexico. Burr's version was that he intended to farm 40,000 acres (160 km2) in the Texas Territory which had been leased to him by the Spanish Crown.

In February 1807, Burr was arrested on Jefferson's orders and indicted for treason, despite a lack of firm evidence. While Burr was ultimately acquitted of treason due to the specificity of the US Constitution, the fiasco further destroyed his already faltering political career. Effigies of his likeness were burned throughout the country and the threat of additional charges from individual states forced him into exile in Europe.

Burr's true intentions remain unclear and, as a result, have led to varying theories from historians: some claim that he intended to take parts of Texas and the newly acquired Louisiana Purchase for himself, while others believe he intended to conquer Mexico or even the entirety of North America. The number of men backing him is also unclear, with accounts ranging from fewer than 40 men to upwards of 7,000.

James Wilkinson 

General James Wilkinson was one of Burr's key partners. The Commanding General of the United States Army at the time, Wilkinson was known for his attempt to separate Kentucky and Tennessee from the union during the 1780s.
Burr persuaded President Thomas Jefferson to appoint Wilkinson to the position of Governor of the Louisiana Territory in 1805. Wilkinson would later send a letter to Jefferson that Wilkinson claimed was evidence of Burr's treason.

Contacts with the British 
While Burr was still vice president, in 1804 he met with Anthony Merry, the British Minister to the United States. As Burr told several of his colleagues, he suggested to Merry that the British might regain power in the Southwest if they contributed guns and money to his expedition. Burr offered to detach Louisiana from the Union in exchange for a half million dollars and a British fleet in the Gulf of Mexico. Merry wrote, "It is clear Mr. Burr... means to endeavour to be the instrument for effecting such a connection—he has told me that the inhabitants of Louisiana ... prefer having the protection and assistance of Great Britain." "Execution of their design is only delayed by the difficulty of obtaining previously an assurance of protection & assistance from some foreign power."

Thomas Jefferson was re-elected in 1804, but Burr was not nominated by the Democratic-Republicans to be Jefferson's running mate, and his term as vice president ended in March of 1805.  In November of that year, Burr again met with Merry and asked for two or three ships of the line and money. Merry informed Burr that London had not yet responded to Burr's plans which he had forwarded the previous year. Merry gave him fifteen hundred dollars. Those Merry worked for in London expressed no interest in furthering an American secession. In the spring of 1806, Burr had his final meeting with Merry. In this meeting Merry informed Burr that still no response had been received from London. Burr told Merry, "with or without such support it certainly would be made very shortly." Merry was recalled to Britain on June 1, 1806.

Travels to the Ohio Valley and Louisiana Territory

In 1805 Burr conceived plans to emigrate, which he claimed was for the purpose of taking possession of land in the Texas Territories leased to him by the Spanish (the lease was granted, and copies still exist).

That year Burr traveled from Pittsburgh, down the Ohio River, to the Louisiana Territory. In the spring, Burr met with Harman Blennerhassett, who proved valuable in helping Burr further his plan. He provided friendship, support, and most importantly, access to Blennerhassett Island which he owned on the Ohio River, about 2 miles (3 km) below what is now Parkersburg, West Virginia. In 1806, Blennerhassett offered to provide Burr with substantial financial support. Burr and his co-conspirators used this island as a storage space for men and supplies. Burr tried to recruit volunteers to enter Spanish territories. In New Orleans, he met with the Mexican associates, a group of criollos whose objective was to conquer Mexico (still part of New Spain at the time). Burr was able to gain the support of New Orleans' Catholic bishop for his expedition into Mexico. Reports of Burr's plans first appeared in newspaper reports in August 1805, which suggested that Burr intended to raise a western army and "to form a separate government."

In early 1806, Burr contacted the Spanish diplomat Carlos Martínez de Irujo y Tacón and told him that his plan was not just western secession, but the capture of Washington, D.C. Irujo wrote to his masters in Madrid about the coming "dismemberment of the colossal power which was growing at the very gates" of New Spain. Irujo gave Burr a few thousand dollars to get things started. The Spanish government in Madrid took no action.

Following the events in Kentucky, Burr returned to the West later in 1806 to recruit more volunteers for a military expedition down the Mississippi River. He began using Blennerhassett Island in the Ohio River to store men and supplies. The Governor of Ohio grew suspicious of the activity there, and ordered the state militia to raid the island and seize all supplies. Blennerhassett escaped with one boat, and he met Burr at the operation's headquarters on the Cumberland River. With a significantly smaller force, the two headed down the Ohio to the Mississippi River and New Orleans. Wilkinson had vowed to supply troops at New Orleans, but he concluded that the conspiracy was bound to fail, and rather than providing troops, Wilkinson revealed Burr's plan to President Jefferson.

Arrest 

In February and March 1806, the federal attorney for Kentucky, Joseph Hamilton Daveiss, wrote Jefferson several letters warning him that Burr planned to provoke a rebellion in Spanish-held parts of the West, in order to join them to areas in the Southwest and form an independent nation under his rule. Similar accusations were published against local Democratic-Republicans in the Frankfort, Kentucky, newspaper Western World. Jefferson dismissed Daveiss' accusations against Burr, a Democratic-Republican, as politically motivated.

Daveiss brought charges against Burr, claiming that he intended to make war with Mexico. However, a grand jury declined to indict Burr, who was defended by the young attorney Henry Clay.

By mid-1806, Jefferson and his cabinet began to take more notice of reports of political instability in the West. Their suspicions were confirmed when General Wilkinson sent the president correspondence which he had received from Burr. The text of the letter that was used as the principal evidence against Burr is as follows:

In an attempt to preserve his good name, Wilkinson edited the letters. They had been sent to him in cypher, and he altered the letters to testify to his own innocence and Burr's guilt. He warned Jefferson that Burr was "meditating the overthrow of [his] administration" and "conspiring against the State." Jefferson alerted Congress of the plan, and ordered the arrest of anyone who conspired to attack Spanish territory. He warned authorities in the West to be aware of suspicious activities. Convinced of Burr's guilt, Jefferson ordered his arrest. Burr continued his excursion down the Mississippi with Blennerhassett and the small army of men which they had recruited in Ohio. They intended to reach New Orleans, but in Bayou Pierre, 30 miles north of Natchez, they learned that a bounty was out for Burr's capture. Burr and his men surrendered at Bayou Pierre, and Burr was taken into custody. Charges were brought against him in the Mississippi Territory, but Burr escaped into the wilderness. He was recaptured on February 19, 1807, and was taken back to Virginia to stand trial.

Trial 

Burr was charged with treason because of the alleged conspiracy and stood trial in Richmond, Virginia. He was acquitted due to lack of evidence of treason, as Chief Justice John Marshall did not consider conspiracy without actions sufficient for conviction. A Revolutionary War hero, U.S. Senator, New York State Attorney General and Assemblyman, and finally vice president under Jefferson, Burr adamantly denied and vehemently resented all charges against his honor, his character or his patriotism.

Burr was charged with treason for assembling an armed force to take New Orleans and separate the Western from the Atlantic states. He was also charged with high misdemeanor for sending a military expedition against territories belonging to Spain. George Hay, the prosecuting U.S. Attorney, compiled a list of over 140 witnesses, one of whom was Andrew Jackson. To encourage witnesses to cooperate with the prosecution, Thomas Jefferson gave Hay blank pardons containing Jefferson's signature and the discretion to issue them to all but "the grossest offenders"; Jefferson later amended these instructions to include even those the prosecution believed to be most culpable, if that meant the difference in convicting Burr.

The case was controversial from the beginning. The high misdemeanor charge was dropped when the government was unable to prove that the expedition had been military in nature or directed toward Spanish territory.

Burr's trial brought into question the ideas of executive privilege, state secrets privilege, and the independence of the executive. Burr's lawyers, including John Wickham, asked Chief Justice Marshall to subpoena Jefferson, claiming that they needed documents from Jefferson to present their case accurately. Jefferson proclaimed that, as president, he was "Reserving the necessary right of the President of the U S to decide, independently of all other authority, what papers, coming to him as President, the public interests permit to be communicated, & to whom." He insisted that all relevant papers had been made available, and that he was not subject to this writ because he held executive privilege. He also argued that he should not be subject to the commands of the judiciary, because the Constitution guaranteed the executive branch's independence from the judicial branch. Marshall decided that the subpoena could be issued despite Jefferson's position of presidency. Though Marshall vowed to consider Jefferson's office and avoid "vexatious and unnecessary subpoenas," his ruling was significant because it suggested that, like all citizens, the president was subject to the law.

Marshall had to consider the definition of treason and whether intent was sufficient for conviction, rather than action. Marshall ruled that because Burr had not committed an act of war, he could not be found guilty (see Ex parte Bollman); the First Amendment guaranteed Burr the right to voice opposition to the government. To merely suggest war or to engage in a conspiracy was not enough. To be convicted of treason, Marshall ruled, an overt act of participation must be proven with evidence. Intention to divide the union was not an overt act: "There must be an actual assembling of men for the treasonable purpose, to constitute a levying of war." Marshall further supported his decision by indicating that the Constitution stated that two witnesses must see the same overt act against the country. Marshall narrowly construed the definition of treason provided in Article III of the Constitution; he noted that the prosecution had failed to prove that Burr had committed an "overt act" as the Constitution required.  As a result, the jury acquitted the defendant.

Witness testimony was inconsistent, and one of the few witnesses to testify to an "overt act of treason," Jacob Allbright, perjured himself in the process.  Allbright testified that militia General Edward Tupper raided Blennerhasset Island and attempted to arrest Harman Blennerhasset, but had been stopped by armed followers of Burr, who raised their weapons at Tupper to threaten him. In fact, Tupper had previously provided a deposition stating that when he visited the island, he had no arrest warrant, had not attempted to effect an arrest of anyone, had not been threatened, and had a pleasant visit with Blennerhasset.

The historians Nancy Isenberg and Andrew Burstein write that Burr "was not guilty of treason, nor was he ever convicted, because there was no evidence, not one credible piece of testimony, and the star witness for the prosecution had to admit that he had doctored a letter implicating Burr." In contrast, lawyer and author David O. Stewart concludes that Burr's intention included "acts that constituted the crime of treason, but that in the context of 1806, "the moral verdict is less clear." He points out that neither invasion of Spanish lands nor secession of American territory was considered treasonous by most Americans at the time, in view of the fluid boundaries of the American Southwest at that time, combined with the widespread expectation (shared by President Jefferson) that the United States might well divide into two nations.

Aftermath 
Immediately following the acquittal, straw effigies of Burr, Blennerhassett, Martin, and Marshall were hanged and burned by angry mobs.

Burr, with his prospects for a political career quashed, left the United States for a self-imposed exile in Europe until 1811. He first traveled to England in 1808 in an attempt to gain support for a revolution in Mexico. He was ordered out of the country, so he traveled to France to ask for the support of Napoleon. He was denied and found himself too poor to pay his way home. Finally, in 1811, he was able to sail back to the United States on a French ship.

Upon returning to the United States, he assumed the surname of "Edwards" and returned to New York to resume his law practice. He married Eliza Jumel, the wealthy socialite widow of Stephen Jumel, but she left him after only four months of marriage due to his land speculations and financial mismanagement which reduced her finances. Historians attribute his self-imposed exile and using a different surname in part to escape from his creditors, as he was deeply in debt. Burr died on September 14, 1836, the same day that his divorce from his wife was granted.

Following his involvement with Burr, James Wilkinson was twice investigated by Congress on issues related to the West.  Following an unsuccessful court-martial ordered by President James Madison in 1811, he was allowed to return to his military command in New Orleans.

When the conspiracy was uncovered, Blennerhassett's mansion and island were occupied and allegedly plundered by members of the Virginia militia. He fled with his family, but he was twice arrested. The second time he was held in prison until Burr's acquittal. Blennerhassett went to Mississippi, where he became a cotton planter. Later he moved with his family to Canada, where he practiced law and lived in Montreal. Late in life, Blennerhassett left for Europe and died in Guernsey on February 2, 1831.

See also 

Davis Floyd
 Burr (novel)

Footnotes

Primary sources
"Aaron Burr and the Definition of Treason (1783–1815)." American Eras. 8 vols. Gale Research, 1997–1998. Student Resource Center. Thomson Gale.
"The Aaron Burr Conspiracy (1800–1860)." American Eras. 8 vols. Gale Research, 1997–1998. Student Resource Center. Thomson Gale.
American State Papers, 9th Congress, 2nd Session
Miscellaneous: Volume 1,  468 pp, No. 217. Burr's Conspiracy.
Miscellaneous: Volume 1,  478 pp, No. 223. Burr's Conspiracy – his arrest.
"Burr's Conspiracy, 1805–1807." DISCovering U.S. History. Online Edition. Gale, 2003. Student Resource Center. Thomson Gale.
United States v. Burr, 25 Fed. Cas. 30 (C.C.D. Va. 1807) (Opinion of Marshall, C.J.)

Further reading
 Barker, Joanne. "The Treason Trial of Aaron Burr: America's Would-be Caesar." Famous American Crimes and Trials: 1607–1859 1 (2004): 141+.
 Fisher, Louis. "The Law: Jefferson and the Burr Conspiracy: Executive Power against the Law." Presidential Studies Quarterly 45.1 (2015): 157–174. online
 Fruchtman, Jack. "Hero or Villain? The Treason Trial of Aaron Burr (1807)." in  Michael T. Davis et al. eds. Political Trials in an Age of Revolutions  (Palgrave Macmillan, Cham, 2019). 297–319.
 Hobson, Charles F. The Aaron Burr Treason Trial. (Omohundro Institute of Early American History and Culture, College of William and Mary, 2006).
 Hoffer, Peter. The treason trials of Aaron Burr (U. Press of Kansas, 2008)
 Isenberg, Nancy. Fallen Founder: The Life of Aaron Burr. (Penguin, 2007).
 Lewis Jr., James E.  The Burr Conspiracy: Uncovering the Story of an Early American Crisis (2017) excerpt
McCaleb, Walter Flavius. Aaron Burr Conspiracy: A History from Original and Hitherto Unused Sources (New York: Dodd, Mead, 1903). online
 Melton, Buckner, Aaron Burr, Conspiracy to Treason, 2002, 
 Stewart, David O. American Emperor: Aaron Burr's Challenge to Jefferson's America, New York: Simon & Schuster (2011).
 Wells, Colin. "'Aristocracy', Aaron Burr, and the Poetry of Conspiracy." Early American Literature 39.3 (2004): 553–576.

External links 

 

United States Constitution Article Three case law
Political scandals in the United States
Conspiracies
Conspiracy
1806 in the United States
1807 in the United States
Presidency of Thomas Jefferson
Failed assassination attempts in the United States
Treason in the United States